Big Swing Face may refer to:
Big Swing Face (Buddy Rich Big Band album), 1967
Big Swing Face (Bruce Hornsby album), 2002